Fredson Thayer Bowers (April 25, 1905 – April 11, 1991) was an American bibliographer and scholar of textual editing.

Life
Bowers was a graduate of Brown University and Harvard University (Ph.D.). He taught at Princeton University before moving to the University of Virginia in 1938.

Bowers served as a commander in the United States Navy during World War II leading a group of codebreakers.

In 1947 he led a group of faculty and interested local citizens in founding the Bibliographical Society of the University of Virginia, of which he served as president for many years. He founded its annual publication, Studies in Bibliography, which became a leading journal in the field.

Bowers was awarded a Guggenheim Fellowship in 1958. 
In 1969 he was awarded the Gold Medal of the Bibliographical Society (of London).

He retired in 1975 and at the time of his death, he was Linden Kent Professor of English Emeritus at the University of Virginia.  His second wife, novelist Nancy Hale, died before him in 1988.  Bowers had three sons and a daughter with his first wife: Fredson Bowers, Jr., Stephen, Peter, and Joan.

Bibliography of books written and edited
 Dog owner's handbook, 1936
 Elizabethan revenge tragedy, 1587–1642, 1940
 Randolph, Thomas, 1605–1635, 1942
 Notes on standing type in Elizabethan printing, 1946
 Criteria for classifying hand-printed books as issues and variant states, 1947
 Certain basic problems in descriptive bibliography, 1948
 Principles of bibliographical description, 1949
 George Sandys; a bibliographical catalogue of printed editions in England to 1700, 1950
 English studies in honor of James Southall Wilson, 1951
 Dekker, Thomas, ca. 1572–1632. Dramatic works of Thomas Dekker, 1953
 On editing Shakespeare and the Elizabethan dramatists, 1955
 Whitman, Walt, 1819–1892. Whitman's manuscripts: Leaves of grass (1860) A parallel text, 1955
 Bibliographical way, 1959
 Textual & literary criticism, 1959
 Principles of bibliographical description, 1962
 Hawthorne, Nathaniel, 1804–1864. Scarlet letter, 1963
 Shakespeare, William, 1564–1616. Merry wives of Windsor, 1963
 Bibliography and textual criticism, 1964
 Hamlet; an outline-guide to the play, 1965
 Hawthorne, Nathaniel, 1804–1864. Blithedale romance and Fanshawe, 1965
 Hawthorne, Nathaniel, 1804–1864. House of the seven gables, 1965
 Bibliography; papers read at a Clark Library seminar, May 7, 1966
 Beaumont, Francis, 1584–1616. Dramatic works in the Beaumont and Fletcher canon, 1966
 On editing Shakespeare, 1966
 William Shakespeare: Hamlet. Adapted by the staff of Barnes & Noble from an original work by Fredson Bowers, 1967
 Dryden, John, 1631–1700. John Dryden: four comedies, 1967
 Dryden, John, 1631–1700. John Dryden: four tragedies, 1967
 Two lectures on editing: Shakespeare and Hawthorne [by] Charlton Hinman and Fredson Bowers, 1969
 Hawthorne, Nathaniel, 1804–1864. Our old home: a series of English sketches, 1970
 Hawthorne, Nathaniel, 1804–1864. Wonder book, and Tanglewood tales, 1972
 Crane, Stephen, 1871–1900. Red badge of courage : a facsimile edition, 1973
 Marlowe, Christopher, 1564–1593. Complete works of Christopher Marlowe, 1973
 Fielding, Henry, 1707–1754. History of Tom Jones, a foundling, 1974
 Essays in bibliography, text, and editing, 1975
 Fielding, Henry, 1707–1754. History of Tom Jones, a foundling, 1975
 James, William, 1842–1910. Meaning of truth, 1975
 James, William, 1842–1910. Essays in philosophy, 1978
 James, William, 1842–1910. Pragmatism, a new name for some old ways of thinking ; The meaning of truth, a sequel to Pragmatism, 1978
 James, William, 1842–1910. Some problems of philosophy, 1979
 James, William, 1842–1910. Will to believe and other essays in popular philosophy, 1979
 Introductions, notes, and commentaries to texts in The dramatic works of Thomas Dekker, 1980
 Nabokov, Vladimir Vladimirovich, 1899–1977. Lectures on literature, 1980
 Nabokov, Vladimir Vladimirovich, 1899–1977. Lectures on Russian literature, 1980
 James, William, 1842–1910. Principles of psychology, 1981
 Marlowe, Christopher, 1564–1593. Complete works of Christopher Marlowe, 1981
 James, William, 1842–1910. Essays in religion and morality, 1982
 Fielding, Henry, 1707–1754. History of Tom Jones, a foundling, 1983
 Kroll, Leon, 1884–1974. Leon Kroll, a spoken memoir, 1983
 Nabokov, Vladimir Vladimirovich, 1899–1977. Lectures on Don Quixote, 1983
 Fielding, Henry, 1707–1754. Tom Jones, 1985
 Elizabethan dramatists, 1987
 Jacobean and Caroline dramatists, 1987
 Hamlet as minister and scourge and other studies in Shakespeare and Milton, 1989
 Principles of bibliographical description, 1994
 Fielding, Henry, 1707–1754. History of Tom Jones, a foundling, 1994
 Fielding, Henry, 1707–1754. History of Tom Jones, a foundling, 2002
 Essays in bibliography, text, and editing, 2003

Notes

References and further reading
 Encyclopedia Virginia:  Fredson Bowers
 Library of Congress bibliography
  
 
 Mirjam M. Foot, Bookbinders at Work:  Their Roles and Methods (New Castle, DE: Oak Knoll Press, 2006)  (about the work of W. W. Greg and Fredson Bowers)

1905 births
1991 deaths
American bibliographers
Brown University alumni
Harvard University alumni
Writers from New Haven, Connecticut
University of Virginia faculty
Textual criticism
Textual scholarship
Bibliographers
20th-century American writers
Corresponding Fellows of the British Academy